The National Salvation Front was an electoral alliance in Tunisia, made up of multiple political parties. The alliance includes the Union for Tunisia and Popular Front coalitions. The Republican Party left the Union for Tunisia alliance on 30 December 2013, though it remains part of the National Salvation Front. After the compromise with Ennahda which resulted in a technocratic government instead of an anti-Ennahda government, the front appears to have splintered between right-wing secularists and left-wing secularists.

Affiliated parties
 Republican Party
 Union for Tunisia:
 Social Democratic Path
 Nidaa Tounes
 Democratic & Patriotic Labour Party
 Socialist Left Party
 Popular Front:
 Workers' Party
 Democratic Patriots' Movement
 People's Movement
 Patriots Democrats
 Party of Progressive Struggle
 Workers’ Left League
 Popular Party for Liberty and Progress
 Unionist Popular Front
 Tunisian Ba'ath Movement led by Othmen Bel Haj Amor – Ba'athist, part of the pro-Iraqi Ba'ath movement
 Arab Democratic Vanguard Party led by Kheireddine Souabni – Ba'athist, also linked to the pro-Iraqi Ba'ath movement
 Green Tunisia
 El Kotb

References

2013 establishments in Tunisia
Political party alliances in Tunisia
Secularism in Tunisia